The Battle of Tarcal or Battle of Tokaj was a battle fought on 27 September 1527 near Tokaj between the Habsburg-German-Hungarian forces of Archduke Ferdinand of Austria and an opposing Hungarian army under the command of John Zápolya. Ferdinand defeated Zápolya.

Background
In 1526, King Louis II of Hungary was killed at the Battle of Mohács. The Hungarian Diet elected Zápolya as their new king. Archduke (and future Holy Roman Emperor) Ferdinand also claimed the crown, and was elected by a rump Diet. This conflict resulted in war between the rivals. In 1527, Ferdinand invaded Hungary  and captured Buda while Zápolya was distracted by a peasant uprising. Zápolya quickly turned to meet Ferdinand, but could only bring limited forces to the field.

The battle
Zápolya's army numbered around 7,000-8,000 men, drawn mainly from eastern Hungary, Transylvania, and Serbia. Ferdinand's army numbered 18,000 men, mostly German mercenaries, but also some of his western Hungarian supporters. 6,000 were under the command of Niklas Graf Salm and Bálint Török. On 26 September Zápolya encamped near Tokaj. Ferdinand's forces engaged with, and defeated a small Zápolya contingent in a skirmish near Sajólád.

On 27 September, Zápolya attacked Ferdinand's main force, bringing on a full-scale battle.  Ferdinand's left-flank troops (from Styria) overwhelmed the Serbian troops of Zápolya's right wing, while German and Austrian mercenaries swept through Zápolya's cavalry. Ferdinand's Hungarian hussars then broke through Zápolya's center, seized his camp, and drove his remaining soldiers to the river Tisza.

Aftermath
Zápolya retreated to Nagyvárad (now Oradea), and Ferdinand thought he had conquered all of Hungary. But Zápolya raised a new army, and in 1528 marched against Ferdinand from Transylvania. At the Battle of Szina Ferdinand once again defeated Zápolya, who fled to Poland. Zápolya allied with the Ottoman sultan Suleiman the Magnificent, who in 1529 drove the Germans out of Hungary and besieged Vienna.

References

Sources
 Szilágyi, Sándor. [http://mek.niif.hu/00800/00893/html/ A Magyar Nemzet Története''' ("History of the Hungarian Nation")]
 Liptai, Ervin (editor). Military History of Hungary'' Budapest: Zrínyi Military Publisher (1985) 

Battles involving Hungary
Battles involving the Holy Roman Empire
Battles involving Austria
Conflicts in 1527
1527 in the Ottoman Empire
16th century in Hungary
Eastern Hungarian Kingdom
Hungarian campaign of 1527–1528